The tenth season of Family Guy premiered on the Fox network from September 25, 2011, to May 20, 2012 with a one-hour broadcast of two episodes. The series follows the Griffin family, a dysfunctional family consisting of father Peter, mother Lois, daughter Meg, son Chris, baby Stewie and the family dog Brian, who reside in their hometown of Quahog. 

The executive producers for the ninth production season, which began in season ten, are Seth MacFarlane, Chris Sheridan, Danny Smith, Mark Hentemann, Steve Callaghan, Alec Sulkin, and Wellesley Wild. The showrunners are Hentemann and Callaghan.

During this season, Peter becomes friends with Ryan Reynolds (guest-voicing as himself), the Griffins win the lottery, Meg falls in love with an Amish boy as Peter goes to war with his family, Stewie starts driving Brian's car and accidentally crashes it, Meg dates Quagmire on her 18th birthday, Chris dates a girl who looks like Lois (voiced by Elliot Page), Quagmire asks Peter and Joe to help him kill his sister's (voiced by Kaitlin Olson) violently abusive boyfriend (voiced by Ralph Garman), Peter befriends a dolphin (voiced by Ricky Gervais), Kevin Swanson (voiced by Scott Grimes) surprisingly returns to Quahog on Thanksgiving, Lois kidnaps Stewie's sick friend, Brian gets a blind girlfriend who hates dogs, James Woods makes a shocking return after being killed last season when Peter becomes an agent to Tom Tucker, Meg delivers a few home truths while scolding her family for all the abuse she personally suffered, Peter has another showdown with his mortal enemy, and Brian and Stewie travel back in time to the premiere Family Guy episode.

Also, the hurricane-themed episode, "Seahorse Seashell Party" that was scheduled to air on May 1, 2011 as part of the ninth season ended up being aired on October 2, 2011 as the second episode of this season and during a crossover called Night of the Hurricane with The Cleveland Show and American Dad!. It was put on hold because of the 2011 Super Outbreak, which killed an estimated 346 people in the Southern United States around the time of the planned original release date.


Marketing
To promote the show's tenth season, Twentieth Century Fox announced a sweepstakes. The sweepstakes reportedly would provide the winner with $3,000, as well as the announcement of the winner's name during the season 10 premiere. Fox celebrated the show's 10th anniversary with an event called the "Something Something Something Anniversary" in which Fox hosted theatrical screenings of 3 episodes each, across 10 cities in the United States.

Episodes

Reception
The season received mixed to negative reviews. Kevin McFarland of The A.V. Club gave a C rating for the season. Tucker Cummings of Yahoo! TV said "Despite a one-hour finale event that delivered a few laughs, 'Viewer Mail #2 / Internal Affairs' tread far too much familiar ground, a problem that's been plaguing the series for some time now." He continued, "There's a tipping point in TV sitcoms where the repeated use of a running joke stops being funny, and just seems lazy and uninspired. If the Viewer Mail concept had been done regularly, it might have seemed more like a tradition (like the Treehouse of Horror on "The Simpsons"). However, by re-using an episode idea from 2002, it seemed to viewers like the creative minds behind the show were lacking creativity. While some of the concepts were funny (the Griffins as British, life from Stewie's perspective), many jokes fell flat."

Notes

References

 
Family Guy seasons
2011 American television seasons
2012 American television seasons